Sylvia Iparraguirre (born 1947) is an Argentine novelist and human rights activist. She is a recipient of the Sor Juana Inés de la Cruz Prize.

Biographic Overview
She was born in Junín, Buenos Aires. Her novel Tierra del Fuego: Una Biografia del Fin del Mundo won the 1999 Sor Juana Inés de la Cruz Prize for women writers in Spanish. It is a fictionalised account of the life of Jemmy Button.

Books
Her books include:
 En el invierno de las ciudades (1988), Editorial Galerna,  
 Probables lluvias por la noche (1993) Emecé Editores,   
 El Parque (1996)
 Tierra del Fuego - tr. Curbstone Press (2000),  (also translated into French and German) - reviewed in English at

Further reading
 Publisher's website

See also
 Lists of writers

Sources
 Bio details and bibliography, Government of Buenos Aires
 Bio details, literatura.org

Argentine people of Basque descent
Argentine women novelists
1947 births
Living people
People from Junín, Buenos Aires
20th-century Argentine novelists
20th-century Argentine women writers
20th-century Argentine writers